George Faulkner (4 June 1900 – 21 April 1969) was an Australian rules footballer who played with Essendon in the Victorian Football League (VFL).

Notes

External links 
		

1900 births
1969 deaths
Australian rules footballers from Victoria (Australia)
Essendon Football Club players